Matthew Jude Griffin (born May 9, 1968) is an American professional football coach and former collegiate player. He served as the head football coach at the University of Tennessee at Martin (UTM) from 2003 to 2006, and Murray State University from 2007 to 2009, compiling a career college football record of 21 wins and 58 losses.

Coaching career

Early positions
Griffin began his coaching career from 1992 to 1993 at Plymouth State College in New Hampshire. From there he joined the University of Richmond in 1994, and then was at Northeastern University from 1995 to 1996. With the Huskies he oversaw the quarterbacks and the offensive backfield. From 1997 to 1998, Griffin served as offensive coordinator at the University of Tennessee at Martin, where he also coached the Skyhawks quarterbacks and wide receivers. In 1999, he joined the University of Maine, working with the tight ends during his first year. Griffin coached the Black Bears offensive line for the next three seasons, assuming additional duties as recruiting coordinator in 2002.

Tennessee–Martin
Griffin was named head football coach at the University of Tennessee at Martin on December 10, 2002. The Skyhawks had not won a conference game in six years prior to his arrival. Under Griffin, the team improved to 4–4 in Ohio Valley Conference (OVC) play and a 6–5 overall record by his third season in 2005. This was the first winning season for the Skyhawks since 1993. Griffin was subsequently honored by the Tennessee Sports Writers Association as Tennessee's College Football Coach of the Year.

Murray State
Griffin was named head football coach at Murray State University on December 12, 2005. In his first season, the Racers went 1–10 overall and 0–8 in OVC play. In 2007, the team minimally improved to 2–9 overall and 1–7 in conference play. Griffin's third season was his best, leading the Racers to a 5–7 overall record and a 4–4 mark in conference. In his fourth season, the Racers slipped back to 3–8 overall and 2–6 in OVC play. Following four straight losing seasons and an overall record of 11–34, Griffin was fired on November 16, 2009.

Post-Murray State
In 2011, Griffin was offensive quality control coach for the Jacksonville Jaguars of the NFL. The following year, he was offensive coordinator and quarterbacks coach for the Omaha Nighthawks of the UFL. Griffin returned to the college level in 2013 as director of player personnel at Georgia Tech. Griffin was fired from Georgia Tech in May 2014 after he was accused of abusing his expense account.

Personal life
Griffin graduated from the University of New Hampshire in 1992 with a bachelor's degree in political science.

Head coaching record

References

1968 births
Living people
American football quarterbacks
Jacksonville Jaguars coaches
Maine Black Bears football coaches
Murray State Racers football coaches
New Hampshire Wildcats football players
Northeastern Huskies football coaches
People from Gardner, Massachusetts
Players of American football from Massachusetts
Plymouth State Panthers football coaches
Richmond Spiders football coaches
UT Martin Skyhawks football coaches
Coaches of American football from Massachusetts
Sportspeople from Worcester County, Massachusetts